Smeeni is a commune in Buzău County, Muntenia, Romania. It is composed of seven villages: Albești, Bălaia, Călțuna, Moisica, Smeeni, Udați-Lucieni and Udați-Mânzu.

Natives
Chivu Stoica

Notes

Communes in Buzău County
Localities in Muntenia

ro:Smeeni, Buzău